The Campaign to Suppress Bandits in Wuping was a counter-insurgency campaign waged by the communists against the nationalist guerrillas, which mostly consisted of bandits and nationalist regular troops left behind after the nationalist government withdrew from mainland China. The campaign was fought during the Chinese Civil War in the post-World War II era and resulted in communist victory.  This campaign was part of the Campaign to Suppress Bandits in Fujian.

Strategies
The nationalists had faced a precarious dilemma in waging the campaign against its communist enemy because of complex situation they had faced, and consequently, made several grave miscalculations which contributed to their eventual failure.

Nationalist miscalculations
Like other nationalist futile attempts to fight guerrilla and insurgency warfare against the communists after being driven off from mainland China, the very first grave strategic miscalculation made by the retreating nationalist government contributed at least equally if not greater than the enemy's political and military pressure to the nationalist defeat in this campaign.  The very first strategic miscalculation made by the retreating nationalist government was identical to the earlier one the nationalist government had made immediately after World War II, when it had neither the sufficient troops nor enough transportation assets to be deployed into the Japanese-occupied regions of China, and unwilling to let these regions falling into communist hands, the nationalist government ordered the Japanese and their turncoat Chinese puppet government not to surrender to the communists and allowed them to keep their fighting capabilities to "maintain order" in the Japanese occupied regions by fighting off the communists.  This earlier miscalculation resulted in further alienation and resentment to the nationalist government by the local population, which had already blamed the nationalists for losing the regions to the Japanese invaders during the war.  Half a decade later when the nationalists were driven from mainland China, they had made the similar miscalculation once again in their desperation, this time by enlisting the help of local bandits to fight the communists, and ordering the nationalist troops left behind to join these bandits in the struggle against the communism.  However, the bandits were deeply feared and hated by the local populace they plagued for so long, and nationalist troops left behind joining the bandits certainly did not help them win the support of the general population.  In fact, it served the exact opposite, strengthening the popular support of their communist enemy.

The second grave strategic miscalculation made by the retreating nationalist government was also similar to the one the nationalist government had made immediately after World War II, when it attempted to simultaneously solve the warlord problem that had plagued China for so long with the problem of the exterminating communists together: those warlords allied with Chiang Kai-shek's nationalist government were only interested in keeping their own power and defected to the Japanese side when Japanese invaders offered to let them keep their power in exchange for their collaborations.  After World War II, these forces of former Japanese puppet governments once again returned to the nationalist camp for the same reason they defected to the Japanese invaders. Obviously, it was difficult for Chiang to immediately get rid of these warlords for good as soon as they surrendered to Chiang and rejoined nationalists, because such move would alienate other factions within the nationalist ranks, and those former Japanese puppet government's warlords could still help the nationalists to by holding on to what was under their control and fighting off communists, and they and the communists would both be weakened.  Similarly, the bandits the nationalist governments had failed to exterminate were obviously not good candidates for evacuation to Taiwan half a decade later, and using them to fight communists appeared to be the only logical alternative.  If the communists were great weakened by the bandits, then it would the nationalists would have easier time in their counterattacks to retake China.  If the bandits were defeated, then the nationalists would have easier job to eradicate them later after retaking China.  However, just like those warlords, these bandits were only interested in keeping their own power also, and thus did not put any real efforts to fight the communists like some of the nationalists who were dedicated to their political cause.  The eradication of bandits by the communist government only strengthened its popular support since previous governments (including the nationalist government itself) dating back from Qing Dynasty had failed to do so.

The third grave strategic miscalculation made by the retreating nationalist government was similar to the second one, but this one was about its own troops left behind.  The nationalist government had faced a dilemma: the highly disciplined troops were in desperate need to defend Taiwan, the last nationalist island sanctuary.  The less disciplined second rate and undisciplined third rate troops, both of which mostly consisted of warlords' troop were definitely not suited to be withdrawn to defend the last stand nationalists had made, and they were not given the top priority for evacuation.  Instead, they were left behind to fight the communists behind the enemy line, but such move had alienated many of the troops left behind, and it was impossible to expect them to fight their communist enemy with the same kind of dedication like those nationalist agents who believed in their political cause.  Compounding the problem, due to the need of bandits' knowledge of local area, they were often rewarded with higher ranks than the nationalist troops left behind.  As a result, the former-nationalist regular troops turned guerrilla fighters lacked any willingness to work together with the bandits they once attempted to exterminate, especially when many of the bandits had killed their comrades-in-arms earlier in the battles of eradications / pacifications.  Many loyal nationalists were enraged by the fact that they had to serve under the former-enemy they once fought.  Similarly, the bandits lacked the similar willingness and attempted to expend those nationalist troops whenever they could in order to save their own lives.

The fourth grave strategic miscalculation made by the retreating nationalist government was financial / economical: due to the lack of money, those bandits turned guerrillas were mostly provided with arms, but not sufficient supplies and money.  The bandits turned guerrillas had no problem of looting the local population to get what they need, as they had done for decades, which inevitably drove the general popular support further into the communist side.  The little financial support provided by the nationalist government was simply not enough to support such guerrilla and insurgency warfare on such a large scale.  Another unexpected but disastrous result of the insufficient financial support was that it had greatly eroded the support of the nationalist government within its own ranks.  The wealthy landowners and businessmen were the strong supporters of nationalist government and as their properties were confiscated by the communists and redistributed to the poor, their hatred toward the communist government was enough to cause many of them to stay behind voluntarily to fight behind the enemy lines.  However, the landowners and businessmen were also longtime victims of bandits due to their wealth, and many of them had suffered even more than the general populace who had far less wealth.  As these former landowners and businessmen turned guerrilla fighters were ordered to join their former bandits who once threatened, looted, kidnapped and even killed them and their relatives, it was obvious that such cooperation was mostly in name only and could not produce any actual benefits, and the alienation and discontent toward the nationalist government harbored by these once ardent nationalists would only grow greater.

Another problem for the nationalists was the strong disagreement among themselves over how to fight the war against their communist enemy.   Military professionals preferred to fight a total war, incapacitate the enemy's ability to fight, but this inevitably conflicted with the interest of another faction of strong supporters of the nationalist government: the landowners and businessmen, who joined bandits to oppose such tactic.  The reason was that landowners and businessmen supporting and joining the nationalist guerrilla firmly believed that the nationalists would be able to retake mainland China within several years and they would be able to regain their lost lands, businesses, and other properties that were confiscated and redistributed to the poor by the communists.  As the nationalist military professionals in the guerrilla suggested and destroyed the production facilities and businesses as part of the total war, the landowners and businessmen would not be able to regain any valuable properties after the return of the nationalist government because those properties had been destroyed.  The bandits agreed with the businessmen and landowners to oppose the idea of total war for a different reason: when the properties were destroyed and productivity dropped, they would not be able to loot enough supply to survive.  As a result, despite the animosities between the bandits and landowners and businessmen, they were united together in the opposition to the military professional faction of the nationalists.

Communist strategies
In contrast to the nationalists, the communists had much simpler but effective strategy because communists did not have the dilemma the nationalists had, and all they had to do was to eradicate bandits.  The job of fighting a counterinsurgency and counter guerrilla war was made much easier for the communists by the grave strategic miscalculations nationalists they had made themselves, and communists exploited these to the maximum for their advantage.  As with all other bandit eradication campaigns, the most important communist strategy was to mobilize the entire population to fight the bandits, and furthermore, additional strategies were devised specifically to fit the local situation to fight the bandits.

Order of battle
Nationalists:
Fujian – Guangdong Column
Ding Riverine Protecting Group
Communists:
259th Regiment (Infantry)
5th Regiment of Guangdong Xingmei Military Sub-region
Garrison Regiment of Longyan Military Sub-region
Wuping County Garrison Group (Battalion)

Campaign
After nationalists withdrew from Wuping, they sent many agents and military professionals to local bandits to help the latter to wage a guerrilla war against the communists.  In January 1951, the communists mobilized several units totaling over three thousand to eradicate local bandits, headed by the communist 259th Infantry Regiment.  Ruan Wenbing (阮文炳), the commander of the communist 259th Regiment and Li Feng (李峰), the political commissar of the communist 259th Regiment were joined by the local communist party secretary Chen Zhongping (陈仲平) of Wuping County to form the headquarters of this bandit suppression campaign.  The communists divided Wuping County into four regions, each assigned to a particular military unit:
Communist 259th Regiment is responsible for the northern region
Communist 5th Regiment of Guangdong Xingmei Military Sub-region was responsible for the southern region
Communist Wuping County Garrison Group was responsible for the western region
Communist Garrison Regiment of Longyan Military Sub-region was responsible for the eastern region.
In addition to deploying the military and police, the general populace was also mobilized in the campaign, with great success.  Military formations were primarily fighting on the platoon scale, and supported by local populace. In February 1950, after six days and six nights of combing through the mountains by the communist force, over ninety bandits were annihilated.  Meanwhile, political pressure also produced results.  The nationalist Ding Riverine Protecting Group in the  eastern region and bandits in the northern region totaling over a hundred surrendered to the communists  without a fight.  In October 1950, in the region of Fresh Water Pond (Xianshuitang, 鲜水塘) of Shifang (十方) Hamlet, the highest ranking nationalist commander, Jiang Deping (蒋德平), the commander-in-chief of Fujian – Guangdong Column and his deputy, Lin Zha (林叱) were captured with three of their staff members.  By late October 1950, in the border region of Wuping County and Shanghang County, communist forces succeeded in completely annihilating bandits headed by Lin Hanqiang (林汉强) totaling over a hundred, after combing through their hiding place in Huangqing (皇庆山) Mountain continuously for four nights and three days.

By 1951, bandits headed by Lan Qiguan (蓝启观) totaling over four hundred fifty were annihilated, including over four hundred being captured alive, and an additional eight hundred defected to the communist side.  With the organized bands of bandits eradicated, the communist main force withdrew from the region by the end of the year, and beginning in 1952, the campaign turned to mopping up operations carried out by militias and police.  In the summer of 1952, bandit chieftain Zhong Guoxun (钟国勋) and his allies captured alive, and in the spring of 1953, bandit chieftain Zhong Yong (钟勇) and his allies were also captured.  By June 1955, all bandits in the local area were annihilated and the campaign concluded with communist victory.  A total of 3,143 bandits were annihilated, including 533 killed, 998 captured, and 1,592 defected to the communist side.  Additionally, the communist victory also included capturing 18 machine guns, 11 sub-machine guns, 490 handguns and 3734 rifles, 20 artillery pieces, and two radio sets.

Outcome
Although sharing the common anticommunist goal, the nationalist guerrilla and insurgency warfare was largely handicapped by the enlistment of bandits, many of whom had fought and killed nationalist troops earlier in the eradication / pacification campaign, and also looted, kidnapped and even killed landlords and business owners, an important faction that supported the nationalist government, but now must united against the common enemy, which is half-hearted at the best. Compounding the problem further with additional differences within the ranks of the nationalist guerrillas themselves, the futile nationalist guerrilla and insurgency warfare against its communist enemy was destined to fail.

See also
List of battles of the Chinese Civil War
National Revolutionary Army
History of the People's Liberation Army
Chinese Civil War

References

 Zhu, Zongzhen and Wang, Chaoguang, Liberation War History, 1st Edition, Social Scientific Literary Publishing House in Beijing, 2000,  (set)
 Zhang, Ping, History of the Liberation War, 1st Edition, Chinese Youth Publishing House in Beijing, 1987,  (pbk.)
 Jie, Lifu, Records of the Liberation War: The Decisive Battle of Two Kinds of Fates, 1st Edition, Hebei People's Publishing House in Shijiazhuang, 1990,  (set)
 Literary and Historical Research Committee of the Anhui Committee of the Chinese People's Political Consultative Conference, Liberation War, 1st Edition, Anhui People's Publishing House in Hefei, 1987, 
 Li, Zuomin, Heroic Division and Iron Horse: Records of the Liberation War, 1st Edition, Chinese Communist Party History Publishing House in Beijing, 2004, 
 Wang, Xingsheng, and Zhang, Jingshan, Chinese Liberation War, 1st Edition, People's Liberation Army Literature and Art Publishing House in Beijing, 2001,  (set)
 Huang, Youlan, History of the Chinese People's Liberation War, 1st Edition, Archives Publishing House in Beijing, 1992, 
 Liu Wusheng, From Yan'an to Beijing: A Collection of Military Records and Research Publications of Important Campaigns in the Liberation War, 1st Edition, Central Literary Publishing House in Beijing, 1993, 
 Tang, Yilu and Bi, Jianzhong, History of Chinese People's Liberation Army in Chinese Liberation War, 1st Edition, Military Scientific Publishing House in Beijing, 1993 – 1997,  (Volume 1), 7800219615 (Volume 2), 7800219631 (Volume 3), 7801370937 (Volume 4), and 7801370953 (Volume 5)

Campaigns of the Chinese Civil War
1950s in China